Ragalaipuram is a 2013 Indian Tamil language comedy drama film written and directed by Mano, which is a remake of the 1991 Malayalam film Aanaval Mothiram. The film features Karunas, Angana Roy, and Sanjana Singh in the lead roles. The music was composed by Srikanth Deva. The film opened to mixed reviews upon release on 18 October 2013.

Cast

 Karunas as Velu
 Angana Roy as Kalyani
 Sanjana Singh as SI Shwetha
 Bharath Reddy as SI Suresh 
 Manobala as Inspector
 Uma as Velu's mother
 M. S. Bhaskar as Vincent
 Pawan as Burma Kumar
 Vaiyapuri as Insurance Policy Agent
 Delhi Ganesh as Constable Pandian
 Kovai Sarala as Head Constable Ekavalli
 Singampuli
 O. A. K. Sundar as SI Veerapandi
 Mayilsamy
 Ken Karunas
 Kottaikumar
 Shakeela as Kuruvamma (Special Appearance)
Sridhar  (Special Appearance - "Obamavum")

Production
The film was first reported in February 2012, with debutant Mano chosen to direct the remake of the 1991 Malayalam film Aanaval Mothiram with Karunas selected to produce the venture and play the lead role while his son Ken made a cameo appearance in the film. Angana Roy was selected to make her debut in the film as lead actress, though Vathikuchi ended up being her first release, owing to the film's delay.

Soundtrack
Soundtrack of the film was scored by Srikanth Deva, while lyrics written by Vairamuthu and Mano. Songs received mixed reviews upon release.
 "Ragalapuram" - V. M. Mahalingam, Grace Karunas
 "Adi Devaloga" - Febin Pillai
 "Obamavum" - Karunas
 "Sudamani" - Srikanth Deva, Grace Karunas
 "Obamavum" Remix - Karunas

Release
The film opened to poor reviews from critics. A critic from the Times of India noted "Ragalaipuram is a textbook example of how to make a lowest common denominator entertainer." Sify.com wrote that "the Tamil remake is nowhere near the original, as director Mano's jokes fall flat and the comic scenes are so predictable."

References

External links
 

2013 films
Tamil remakes of Malayalam films
2010s Tamil-language films
Fictional portrayals of the Tamil Nadu Police
Films scored by Srikanth Deva